Loch Scoly is a small hill loch, lying to the north-east of Loch Kennard and west of Loch Skiach, on Grandtully Hill within Perth and Kinross, Scotland.

References

Scoly
Scoly
Tay catchment